Sitaizui Township is a township in Chongli District, Zhangjiakou, Hebei, China. The township is home to the village of Taizicheng, which will serve as a venue for a number skiing events in the 2022 Winter Olympics.

Geography 
Sitaizui Township is located in the southeast portion of Chongli District. The township is bordered by Chicheng County to the east, Xuanhua District to the south, the town of  within Chongli District to the west, and the town of  within Chongli District to the north.

The majority of Sitaizui Township's area is forested.

Administrative divisions 
Sitaizui Township governs the following 31 village-level divisions:

 Sitaizui Village
 Majugou Village
 Changgouzi Village
 Jiucaiping Village
 Hualinzi Village
 Xingrenmagou Village
 Heyanggou Village
 Xinzhangzi Village
 Gouzhang Village
 Goumen Village
 Huangtuyao Village
 Lujiawan Village
 Wangzigou Village
 Guzuizi Village
 Qian'erdaogou Village
 Heitugou Village
 Dasonggoumen Village
 Erdaoying Village
 Sandaoying Village
 Zhuanwagou Village
 Mazhangzi Village
 Xiping Village
 Dongping Village
 Yaoziwan Village
 Shuiquanzi Village
 Zhuanzhilian Village
 Taizicheng Village
 Yingcha Village
 Kuyangshu Village
 Qipanliang Village
 Laohugou Village
 Dongping Industrial and Mining Area

Demographics 
A 2020 government publication stated that Sitaizui Township is home to 13,942 people, who comprise 5,238 different households.

Economy 
The township's economy is largely based on vegetable growing, and skiing-related tourism. Tourism relating to other outdoor activities, such as hiking, mountain climbing, and cycling has grown in recent years. Sitaizui Township used to host a number of mines, however, the local government has encouraged a shift towards agriculture.

See also 

 2022 Winter Olympics
 Taizicheng

References 

Township-level divisions of Hebei
Zhangjiakou